The TEP70 is a main line single-unit diesel locomotive, rated at , with AC/DC transmission and individual axle traction control, designed to haul passenger trains on the Russian gauge railway network of eastern Europe. As of 2022, it is still in service in Russia, Ukraine, Belarus, Estonia, Latvia, Lithuania, and Kazakhstan. It is the successor to the TEP60, with many design elements is derived from that locomotive; however, the engine was replaced by a four-stroke one. TEP70, especially its experimental batch (first 7 locomotives), incorporated some features of British Rail HS4000, for example, its bogies and some elements of driving control equipment. Later batches of this locomotive incorporated some design features from TEP75 experimental locomotive and predecessor TEP70. Final batches, produced until 2006, also had several important improvements.

The TEP70 diesel locomotive has been used as the basis of two other sub classes, the TEP70BS and the TEP70U.

The TEP70 also shares a number of components with the 2TE70 two-unit freight locomotive.

Operators
 RŽD Russia
 Belarusian Railways
 Ukrainian Railways
 Lithuanian Railways
 Latvian Railways
 GO Rail (Estonian operator)
 Kazakhstan Railways
 Türkmendemirýollary

Gallery

See also
 The Museum of the Moscow Railway, at Paveletsky Rail Terminal, Moscow
 Rizhsky Rail Terminal, Moscow, Home of the Moscow Railway Museum
 Varshavsky Rail Terminal, St.Petersburg, Home of the Central Museum of Railway Transport, Russian Federation
 History of rail transport in Russia

References

Railway locomotives introduced in 1973
Diesel-electric locomotives of Russia
Luhanskteplovoz locomotives
Co′Co′ locomotives
5 ft gauge locomotives